The Curse of La Llorona (also known as The Curse of the Weeping Woman in some markets) is a 2019 American supernatural horror film directed by Michael Chaves, in his feature directorial debut, and written by Mikki Daughtry and Tobias Iaconis. It is the  sixth  installment in The Conjuring Universe franchise. Based on the Latin American folklore of La Llorona, the film stars Linda Cardellini, Raymond Cruz, and Patricia Velásquez, and follows a mother in 1973 Los Angeles who must save her children from a malevolent spirit trying to steal them. The film was produced by James Wan through his Atomic Monster Productions banner.

The Curse of La Llorona premiered at South by Southwest on March 15, 2019, and was theatrically released in the United States on April 19, 2019. It received negative reviews, with criticism aimed at its reliance on jump scares, and grossed $123 million worldwide against a budget of $9 million, becoming the lowest-grossing film in the Conjuring franchise, though still successful at the box office.

Plot
In 1673 Mexico, a family plays in a field, and the youngest son gives his mother a necklace, who says she will treasure the item forever. The boy goes on a hike a while later and finds his mother violently drowning his brother in a stream. Horrified, he runs, but his mother catches him and drowns him too.

300 years later, in 1973 Los Angeles, caseworker Anna investigates the truancy of client Patricia Alvarez's two children. Arriving at Patricia's house for a welfare check, she finds the children locked behind a door. Patricia attacks her and is taken away by the police. Patricia's sons, Carlos and Tomas, tell Anna to keep them in the room, so they are protected. Ignoring their warnings, she takes them to the child-services shelter. There, Tomas sleepwalks, and Carlos follows him until both boys see a woman in a white dress who attacks them.

The boys are found drowned in a river, and Anna is called out to the scene. She brings her own children, Chris and Sam, and they stay in the car while she investigates. She hears Patricia, accused of her sons' murders, screaming that it was Anna's fault for taking her sons and that Patricia had tried to stop the malevolent force of "La Llorona."

Chris leaves the car out of curiosity and encounters La Llorona (The Weeping Woman), who seizes his wrist and leaves burns. She stalks him back to the car, but leaves once Anna returns and the family flees the scene. The next day, La Llorona also grabs Sam and leaves identical burn marks. Anna interviews Patricia, who has an alibi for the time of her sons' deaths. However, Patricia reveals that in her hatred for Anna, she prayed to La Llorona to bring her own boys back and take Anna's children instead. Soon after, Anna encounters La Llorona when the spirit attempts to drown Sam in the bathtub. The ghost leaves burn marks on Anna's arm too. Anna seeks help from Father Perez, who relates the case to his previous experiences with a haunted porcelain doll. Perez tells Anna about former priest Rafael Olvera who has since became a folk shaman, who may be able to help them. Rafael arrives at Anna's house, setting up items for protection. In the night, La Llorona repeatedly attacks them and attempts to drown Anna and Sam in the pool. Anna pulls off La Llorona's necklace in the struggle.

Patricia arrives with a gun and tries to give Anna's children to La Llorona. Sam and Chris flee, and Patricia comes to her senses and releases Anna, allowing her to help her children. Chris delays La Llorona by showing her the necklace that La Llorona's son had given her. This makes La Llorona briefly assume her human appearance and caress Chris, imagining him to be her real son. However, Sam accidentally unveils a mirror, and La Llorona reverts and proceeds to attack them. Anna stabs her through the chest with a cross made from a Fire Tree given by Rafael: trees that grew by the river where La Llorona drowned her children and were the only "witness" to her crime. The spirit is destroyed.

Anna and her children thank Rafael for his help. When he leaves, Anna looks down into a puddle of water beside the road.

Cast

Production
On October 9, 2017, it was announced that New Line Cinema would distribute a horror film directed by Michael Chaves, with James Wan and It and Annabelle writer Gary Dauberman serving as producers. Then titled The Children, in July 2018, the film was renamed The Curse of La Llorona. In October 2017, Linda Cardellini was cast to play a single mother and the lead character. It was also announced that Sean Patrick Thomas and Raymond Cruz would co-star in the film.

After the first trailer's release, it was revealed that Tony Amendola was returning as Father Perez, last seen in the film Annabelle. The character gives direction to the family being tormented by the titular spirit and relates the haunting to his experiences with the demonic entity attached to the doll. In March 2019, it was revealed that The Curse of La Llorona is part of the Conjuring Universe, making it the sixth installment in the franchise. Despite this, the film's director has insisted that it is not part of the Conjuring Universe.

Principal photography on the film wrapped in November 2017.

Release
The Curse of La Llorona was theatrically released in the United States and several other territories on April 19, 2019, by Warner Bros. Pictures and New Line Cinema. It had its world premiere at South by Southwest on March 15, 2019. The studio spent an estimated $35–40million on domestic advertisements for the film.

The Curse of La Llorona was released on Digital HD on July 16, 2019, and was released on Blu-ray and DVD on August 6, 2019.

Reception

Box office
The Curse of La Llorona grossed $54.7million in the United States and Canada, and $68.4million in other territories, for a worldwide total of $123.1million, against a production budget of $9million, becoming the lowest-grossing film in the Conjuring franchise. Deadline Hollywood calculated the net profit of the film to be $45.6million, when factoring together all expenses and revenues.

In the United States and Canada, the film was released alongside Under the Silver Lake and was projected to gross $15–17million from 3,372 theaters in its opening weekend. It made $11.8million on its first day, including $2.75million from Thursday night previews, and went on to over-perform, grossing $26.5million in its opening weekend and topping the box office; 49% of the opening weekend audience was Hispanic. In its second weekend, the film fell 69.5% to $8million, finishing third.

Critical response
The website's critical consensus reads, "Content to coast on jump scares rather than tap into its story's creepy potential, The Curse of La Llorona arrives in theaters already broken." At Metacritic, the film has a weighted average score of 41 out of 100, based on 28 critics, indicating "mixed or average reviews". Audiences polled by CinemaScore gave the film an average grade of "B−" on an A+ to F scale, while those at PostTrak gave it 2.5 out of 5 stars and a "definite recommend" of 48%.

Accolades

References

External links
 
 
 
 

2019 horror films
2019 horror thriller films
2010s ghost films
American ghost films
American horror thriller films
American supernatural horror films
American supernatural thriller films
The Conjuring Universe
2010s English-language films
2019 films
Films produced by James Wan
Films scored by Joseph Bishara
Films set in 1973
Films set in Los Angeles
Films set in the 1670s
Interquel films
Hispanic and Latino American horror films
American horror drama films
Films about Mexican Americans
New Line Cinema films
Films about families
La Llorona
Film spin-offs
Warner Bros. films
Spanish-language American films
Films directed by Michael Chaves
2010s American films